The De La Salle Lady Booters are the varsity women's football team of the De La Salle University. They compete at the University Athletic Association of the Philippines (UAAP), as well as at the PFF Women's League, the top flight domestic women's football league in the Philippines.

PFF Women's League
The collegiate squad was among the pioneer teams of the first season of the PFF Women's League which ran from 2016 to 2017. De La Salle was assured of the league title of the 2016-17 season after their first second round match against OutKast which ended in a 3–0 win. They were undefeated in that season garnering 13 wins or 39 points.

De La Salle won the second league title in 2018 winning 2–1 over the University of Santo Tomas in the de facto final.

2016 squad

Officials
As of 3 December 2016

Honors
UAAP Football Championship
Champions: 11 (1995–96, 1998–99, 1999–00, 2002–03, 2003–04, 2004–05, 2005–06, 2009–10, 2016–17, 2017–18, 2018–19)

PFF Women's League
Champions: 3   (2017-18 1st PFF Women's League 2017, 2018-2019 2nd PFF Women's League 2018 and 2019-20 3rd PFF Women's League 2019)

PFF Women's Cup
Runners-up: 1 (2015)

See also
De La Salle Green Archers

References

De La Salle University
University Athletic Association of the Philippines football teams
Women's football clubs in the Philippines
PFF Women's League clubs